The 2017–18 FA Women's Premier League Plate is the fourth running of the competition, which began in 2014. It is the secondary League Cup competition run by the FA Women's Premier League (FA WPL), and is run in parallel with the league's primary League Cup competition, the Premier League Cup.

The teams that take part in the WPL plate are decided after the determining round of the WPL Cup. The winners of determining round matches continue in the WPL Cup, while the losers move into the WPL Plate.

All 71 Premier League clubs were included in the determining round draw, with 36 teams progressing in the Cup and 35 continuing in the Plate.

Reigning champions Lewes, who beat Huddersfield Town 4–0 in the 2016–17 final, won their determining Round match this season, meaning that they did not defend their title.

Results
All results listed are published by The Football Association. Games are listed by round in chronological order, and then in alphabetical order of the home team where matches were played simultaneously.

The division each team play in is indicated in brackets after their name: (S)=Southern Division; (N)=Northern Division; (SW1)=South West Division One; (SE1)=South East Division One; (M1)=Midlands Division One; (N1)=Northern Division One.

Preliminary round
Due to there being 35 teams in the competition, three preliminary round matches are played to eliminate three teams allowing a full single-elimination knockout tournament to take place.

First round

Second round
The eight second round matches were originally scheduled to be played on Sunday 10 December 2017 before all except one were postponed due to severe weather throughout the country.

Quarter-finals

Semi-finals

Final

Notes and references

Notes

References

FA Women's National League Plate
Prem